Christian Apraham Yeladián Camejo (born 17 September 1983) is a Uruguayan footballer of Armenian origins who plays as a midfielder for Bella Vista.

Club career
Yeladian has played for C.A. Bella Vista, Montevideo Wanderers and Juventud in the Uruguayan Primera División.

In mid-2009 he was transferred to Iran Pro League side Foolad.

In August 2010, he signed a new deal with the Brazililian club Esporte Clube Juventude.

On 30 August 2011, he returned to his home land and signed a new contract with Danubio.

Statistics

References

 Carmelita concreta cinco refuerzos, deporticos.co.cr, 5 January 2016

External links
 Profile at soccerway
 Stats at footballdatabase.eu
 Christian Yeladian at Soccerway

1983 births
Living people
Uruguayan people of Armenian descent
Armenian footballers
Uruguayan footballers
Uruguayan expatriate footballers
C.A. Bella Vista players
Juventud de Las Piedras players
Foolad FC players
Esporte Clube Juventude players
C.D. Técnico Universitario footballers
Montevideo Wanderers F.C. players
Danubio F.C. players
C.A. Rentistas players
Boston River players
Alianza F.C. footballers
Municipal Pérez Zeledón footballers
A.D. Carmelita footballers
Sportivo Cerrito players
Uruguayan Primera División players
Uruguayan Segunda División players
Liga FPD players
Campeonato Brasileiro Série C players
Uruguayan expatriate sportspeople in Ecuador
Uruguayan expatriate sportspeople in Brazil
Uruguayan expatriate sportspeople in Iran
Uruguayan expatriate sportspeople in El Salvador
Uruguayan expatriate sportspeople in Costa Rica
Expatriate footballers in Ecuador
Expatriate footballers in Brazil
Expatriate footballers in Iran
Expatriate footballers in El Salvador
Expatriate footballers in Costa Rica
Association football midfielders